Greater Morocco is a label historically used by some Moroccan nationalist political leaders protesting against Spanish, Portuguese, Algerian and French rule, to refer to wider territories historically associated with the Moroccan sultan. Current usage most frequently occurs in a critical context accusing Morocco, largely in discussing the disputed Western Sahara, of irredentist claims on neighboring territories.

The main competing ideologies of the Greater Morocco ideology have been Sahrawi nationalism, Mauritanian irredentism, Spanish nationalism, Berber separatism and Pan-Arabism.

Irredentist, official and unofficial Moroccan claims on territories viewed by Moroccans as having been under some form of Moroccan sovereignty (most frequently with respect to the Spanish exclaves), are rhetorically tied back to an accused expansionism. However, Moroccan government claims make no current reference to the Greater Morocco concept.

History 

In 1963, following the Independence of Algeria, Morocco attacked a strip of its south-western regions (Tindouf Province and Béchar Province), claiming that parts of them were previously under Moroccan sovereignty. There were several hundred casualties. French sources reported Algerian casualties to be 60 dead and 250 wounded, with later works giving a number of 300 Algerian dead. Morocco officially reported to have suffered 39 dead. Moroccan losses were probably lower than the Algerians' but are unconfirmed, with later sources reporting 200 Moroccan dead. About 57 Moroccans and 379 Algerians were taken prisoner. After a month of fighting and some hundreds of casualties, the conflict stalemated (see Sand War).

In the early stages of decolonisation certain elected Moroccan politicians, in particular some members of the Istiqlal party, like Allal al-Fassi, the sole advocate of "total liberation" who refused to enter France even to meet with his Monarch or long-standing nationalist colleagues, were in favour of claiming wider territories historically associated in some way with the Moroccan Sultan. This was initially not supported by the Sultan (later King) of Morocco. Al-Fassi's ambitions gained more support in parliament in the beginning of the sixties, leading to a delay in the recognition of Mauritania (independent in 1960, not recognised by Morocco until 1969).

Al-Fassi's wider claims were effectively abandoned in the later sixties, although Morocco claims Western Sahara and the Spanish plazas de soberanía on its northern coast. Morocco's refusal to accept its post-colonial borders in the case of Western Sahara has put it on a collision course with the African Union, which holds this as one of its principles. As a consequence, Morocco is the only African country to step out of the union, because the Polisario Front, representing the Sahrawi Arab Democratic Republic was awarded a seat.

After Moroccan independence in 1956 and the death of King Mohammed V, the government of King Hassan II laid claim on several territories, successfully acquiring the Tarfaya Strip, after the Ifni War with Spain, and much of the territory around Ceuta and Melilla, as well as the acquisition of much of Spanish Sahara after Spain handed the territory to Morocco and Mauritania (see the Madrid Accords, it is still currently under dispute with the Polisario front who claim it as the Sahrawi Arab Democratic Republic).

In 1982, Spain entered the North Atlantic Treaty Organization.
However Ceuta and Melilla are not under NATO protection since Article 6 of the treaty limits the coverage to Europe and North America.
The Canary Islands are protected as they are islands north of the Tropic of Cancer.
Legal experts have interpreted that other articles could cover the Spanish North African cities but this take has not been tested in practice.

In 2002, an armed incident erupted between Morocco and Spain, regarding the uninhabited Perejil Island, located 250m off the Moroccan northern coast. On July 11, 2002 a group of Moroccan soldiers set up base on the islet, violating the status quo situation agreed between both States. The Moroccan government said that they set foot on the island in order to monitor illegal immigration, which was denied by the Spanish government since there had been little co-operation in the matter by that time (a repeated source of complaint from Spain). After protests from the Spanish government, led by José María Aznar, the soldiers were replaced by Moroccan navy cadets who then installed a fixed base on the island. On the morning of July 18, 2002 Spain launched a full-scale military operation to take over the island. The operation was successful and the Moroccan navy cadets were dislodged from the island in a matter of hours without offering any resistance to the Spanish Grupo de Operaciones Especiales (commando) attack force. The islet returned to its status quo situation and is now deserted. It is to highlight the mediation role offered by the United States, and the lack of collaboration of France towards its European allies during the crisis.

In 2021, U.S. President Donald Trump signed a proclamation recognizing Morocco's sovereignty of the Western Sahara in exchange for the recognition of Israel by Morocco. However, the European States did not modify their position with regard to the UN resolutions that recognise the Western Sahara as a territory yet to be decolonised. This, indirectly, together with the hosting of Brahim Gali, leader of the Polisario, for medical treatment in Spain, was seen by Morocco as an aggression, and provoked a new migratory crisis over the Spanish domain of Ceuta, in North Africa. This crisis was polemic, due to the fact that Morocco, beyond the diplomatic channels and with the passive role of the Moroccan frontier police, which did not impede the flow whether it was by jumping the fence or by swimming through the sea that surrounds the frontier line. The Spanish army intervened to control the trespassing and to save people at risk in the sea. At least two people died in the episode when trying to reach the shore.

See also 

Western Sahara
Sand War
Scramble for Africa
Berlin Conference
Spanish Morocco
Plazas de soberanía
Perejil Island
List of Spanish colonial wars in Morocco
List of irredentist claims or disputes
Cold War
Allal al-Fassi
Irredentism

References 

Historiography of Morocco
History of Western Sahara
Morocco
Mauritania–Morocco relations
Moroccan nationalism